Peter Bratt (born 29 April 1944) is a Swedish journalist. For many years he worked for the national Swedish newspaper Dagens Nyheter until he quit 2003.

The IB affair 

Peter Bratt revealed Informationsbyrån together with Jan Guillou in the magazine Folket i Bild/Kulturfront. This was to be known as the IB affair. He also published his own book on IB from Gidlunds förlag (publishers) in 1973, IB och hotet mot vår säkerhet (IB and the threat against our security).

The Geijer affair 
In November 1977 Peter Bratt published an article in Dagens Nyheter on a memo in which the Police Commissioner had stated that the Minister for Justice Lennart Geijer was a security risk.
This led to the Geijer affair, a scandal involving prostitution.

Works 

Kan vi lita på demokratin? intervjuer med Anders Carlberg, Lars Gyllensten, Harald Ofstad, Kurt Samuelsson, 1969
De förrådda idealen: om svensk socialdemokrati och Sverige inför 70-talet, 1969
IB och hotet mot vår säkerhet, Gidlunds Förlag, Stockholm, 1973, 
I fängelse, Gidlunds Förlag, Stockholm, 1974, 
Steg för steg: om stuveriarbetarnas fackliga kamp, 1974
Med rent uppsåt. Albert Bonniers Förlag, Stockholm, 16 October 2007. Memoirs.

References

1944 births
Living people
Place of birth missing (living people)
Swedish journalists